PMFTC, Inc. is the Philippine affiliate of Philip Morris International (PMI). Owned 50-50 by PMI and local conglomerate LT Group, PMFTC is the leading cigarette manufacturer in the Philippines, controlling over 90% of the local market, commercialising the brands Hope Luxury, Marlboro, and More, among others.

The company is a joint-venture between the Philippine unit of PMI and local firm Fortune Tobacco Corporation (FTC), which joined forces in 2010 to form a new company that, after the agreement, would control the 90% of the market.

History
In 1955, Philip Morris International entered into a licensing agreement with La Suerte Cigar and Cigarette Factory to manufacture and sell Marlboro cigarettes in the Philippines.

Fortune Tobacco Corporation (FTC) was established in 1966, founded by Benito Tan Kee Hiong, Atty. Florencio N. Santos, Lucio Tan and Mariano Tanenglian.

In 1995, Philip Morris Philippines, Inc. (PMPI) was established to handle all sales and marketing aspects related to the Marlboro and Philip Morris brands.

In 2002, the licensing agreement with La Suerte was terminated and Philip Morris Philippines Manufacturing, Inc. (PMPMI) was established to handle all aspects of the Philippine business, including manufacturing operations. PMPI was subsequently merged with PMPMI. A new factory located in Tanauan, Batangas was inaugurated by PMPMI in 2003.

On February 25, 2010, PMI and Fortune Tobacco Corporation (FTC) signed an agreement to unite their respective business activities by transferring selected assets and liabilities of both companies a new company named "PMFTC, Inc.", with each party holding an equal economic interest. Lucio Tan served as the chairman of PMFTC, Inc., while day-to-day operations was managed by PMI. The agreement stated that PMI retained its export business, while FTC kept its interest in the distribution of the Winston brand of Japan Tobacco. PMFTC would not be affected by pending tax and ownership disputes with local courts involving FTC.

Brands

PMI brands

 Bowling Gold
 Bowling Green
 Chesterfield
 L&M
 Marlboro
 Miller
 Philip Morris
 Stork

FTC brands

 Boss
 Champion
 Fortune International
 Hope Luxury
 Jackpot International
 Mark
 More
 Salem - under license
 Terra
 Westpoint
 Camel

References

External links
 PMFTC, Inc. on PMI 
 PMFTC on LT Group

Tobacco companies of the Philippines
Philippine companies established in 2010
Companies based in Makati
Philip Morris International